Tu Chuang-hsun born July 26, 1982, is a Taiwanese baseball player who currently plays for Uni-President Lions of the Chinese Professional Baseball League. He currently plays as catcher for the Lions.

References

See also
Chinese Professional Baseball League
Uni-President Lions

1982 births
Living people
Baseball players from Tainan
Uni-President 7-Eleven Lions players
Uni-President 7-Eleven Lions coaches